Skaručna is a village in the Municipality of Vodice in the Upper Carniola region of Slovenia.

Church

The local church is dedicated to Saint Lucy and was built between 1662 and 1665. It was a popular pilgrimage church with people with a variety of eye diseases because Saint Lucy is considered the patron saint of the blind.

References

External links

Skaručna on Geopedia

Populated places in the Municipality of Vodice